Olena Tsyhankova (born 23 January 1999) is a Ukrainian sprint canoeist.

She competed at the 2021 ICF Canoe Sprint World Championships, winning a bronze medal in the C-4 500 m distance.

References

External links

1999 births
Living people
Ukrainian female canoeists
ICF Canoe Sprint World Championships medalists in Canadian